William Green (by 1512 – 1554/55), of Woodford and Downton, Wiltshire, was an English politician.

He was a Member (MP) of the Parliament of England for Downton in 1547.

References

1550s deaths
English MPs 1547–1552
Year of birth uncertain